The Woodlands Checkpoint is one of Singapore's two land border checkpoints, connecting ground traffic with Malaysia. It services the vehicular traffic (cars, buses, lorries, motorcycles) along with pedestrians that goes through the Johor–Singapore Causeway. The only other Singapore land border checkpoint (Tuas Checkpoint) services the Malaysia–Singapore Second Link.

Overview

Current checkpoint (since 1999) 
Whilst the current checkpoint was being renovated to deal with the increasing traffic flow in the short term, plans were mooted to redevelop the 1977 checkpoint in 1989. These plans took nearly a decade to realised. To aid the redevelopment, an additional  8.3 ha of land was to be reclaimed from the waters next to the checkpoint, and this was undertaken by the Housing and Development Board. While the redevelopment at Woodlands was ongoing, the opening of the Malaysia–Singapore Second Link provided some respite to the traffic congestion at the causeway.

The new Woodlands Checkpoint, built partially on reclaimed land, was opened in 1999 to accommodate the increasing traffic flow and the soot which had enveloped the old customs complex over the years. The old customs complex, built in the early 1970s, located at the junction between Woodlands Road and Woodlands Centre Road closed after the new checkpoint was opened on 18 July 1999, although the motorcycle lane remained open in the mornings until 2001, and it was reopened on 1 March 2008 for goods vehicles only.

The new checkpoint complex is attached to the adjacent Woodlands Train Checkpoint, opened on 1 August 1998, as the Singapore railway border clearance facility, which was previously co-located with Malaysian immigration and customs at Tanjong Pagar railway station. The relocation to Woodlands caused disputes between the two countries, which was resolved in 2010. On 1 July 2011, Woodlands Train Checkpoint replaced Tanjong Pagar railway station as Singapore's inter-city railway station. Northbound rail passengers pass through co-located border clearance for both countries at Woodlands Train Checkpoint before boarding the train to Malaysia. Southbound rail passengers clear Malaysian exit controls at JB Sentral, and Singapore immigration and customs on arrival at Woodlands Train Checkpoint.

With regards to road public transport, Woodlands Checkpoint has frequent cross-border bus services linking Bangunan Sultan Iskandar (JB CIQ) in Johor Bahru to northern rapid transit stops such as Kranji MRT station, Marsiling MRT station and Woodlands MRT station (through SBS Transit and SMRT Buses), along with Queen Street (Bugis MRT station) and Newton Circus (Newton MRT station) in downtown Singapore (through Causeway Link). In addition, Woodlands Checkpoint is regularly accessed by commuters walking along a pedestrian footbridge to and from the adjacent Woodlands Train Checkpoint, which has regular and frequent domestic bus and taxi services; the Woodlands Train Chekpoint features a domestic bus stop, a domestic taxi stand and a domestic ride-hail (private hire cars) stand.

History

Background 
Even after the completion of the Johor–Singapore Causeway in 1924 connecting the Singapore island and the peninsula, there was no formal land border checkpoint in Singapore restricting the flow of people between the two lands, until Singapore's independence from Malaysia in 1965. This was due to the fact that Singapore and the rest of Peninsular Malaysia had either been under a single sovereign control (in the form of British colonial administration, Straits Settlements, and Malayan Union and Japanese occupation during World War II in Asia), or enjoined in a single political entity (Federation of Malaysia). During these periods of singular external control, the security of Singapore's side of the Causeway had been nominally managed by the local police authorities. The police would step up its security checks when the situation demanded it, like during the Malayan Emergency or dealing with the aftermath of prison breaks at the prison at Pearl's Hill. Generally people at both sides of the causeway could travel between Singapore and Johor, ergo Peninsular Malaysia freely. Since the independence of Singapore, there have been several physical replacements of the Woodlands Checkpoint complex to accommodate the growing traffic between the two countries, but they have largely located within the same area.

1966 checkpoint 
The independence of Singapore from Malaysia on 9 August 1965 necessitated a customs and immigration checkpoint at Singapore's end of the causeway. The process of establishing diplomatic recognitions between Singapore and Indonesia had left Malaysian politicians feeling uneasy. The era of the joint travel visa enjoyed by both Malaysians and Singaporeans would come to an end, and eventually instead of using identity cards for identification purposes, both citizenries would have to use travel documents such as passports to enter either country. Due to new immigration laws, a checkpoint was established at Woodlands to check on all foreigners, except those who held Malaysian identity cards or having special visa arrangements entering Singapore effective 2 August 1966.

1967 checkpoint 
To fulfil an earlier requirement by the Malaysian government that all travellers between the two nations had to use travel documents by 1 July 1967, the construction for a customs and immigration checkpoint for the causeway was completed and operationalised in time for the 1 July 1967 deadline. However, due to a delay in implementing the new requirement by Malaysia, Singaporeans could travel to Malaysia using their identity cards until 1 September 1967. There were six traffic lanes for incoming traffic and three lanes for outgoing traffic. Services provided at the checkpoint included issuance of Restricted passports.

1977 checkpoint 
By 1972, there was a daily average of 18,000 vehicles travelling through the causeway. This led the Public Works Department to widen the causeway from 30 feet to 83 feet. The projects were completed in 1976. The 1967 checkpoint would also be replaced with an expanded version about 40 metres south of it to process up to a projected 40,000 passengers a day in 1982. The expanded version would cost . The new checkpoint would also host five dog kennels which would house narcotics-sniffing dogs, which would detect more than half of the drugs trafficked through the checkpoint in 1978. The checkpoint was opened in two phases, in May 1977 and January 1978. The opening of the checkpoint also signalled the implementation of the Exit Control Scheme, which was to prevent visitors to the nation from overstaying. It was not implemented earlier as the 1967 checkpoint was already operating at its fullest capabilities. This checkpoint was declared to be able to cope with the traffic for the next ten years as well.

The new checkpoint also saw the introduction of computers with varying levels of success. The initial computers installed by the Registry of Vehicles to check the validity of the vehicles were subject to dusty conditions, and were prone to frequent breakdowns. Additional computers were installed and used in 1981, speeding up the process with greater accuracy to check for people on the immigration blacklists, allowing officers to detect 470 people, up from 35 monthly.

By 1987, it was becoming more apparent that the causeway was becoming jammed with increasing frequency. Short term works, costing , were done on the current checkpoint buildings and fixtures to increase the efficiency of the immigration officiers. Better designed checking booths were introduced in 1986. Existing halls were expanded, with additional clearance lanes being built in 1989. However, such short-term works were projected to help cope with the increasing volume of traffic only into the mid-1990s.

Future extension 
On 30 March 2017, authorities announced that the Old Woodlands Town Centre (OWTC) and two privately-owned blocks were compulsorily acquired by the government, in order for the land to be converted into an extension of the 1999 checkpoint. The tenants and owners at OWTC and the privately-owned blocks were compensated at market value,  and OWTC was closed on 30 November 2017. On 26 May 2022, authorities announced that they would acquire 9 Housing and Development Board blocks of flats for the same extension.

References 

Malaysia–Singapore border crossings
1966 establishments in Singapore
Transport infrastructure completed in 1999
Transport infrastructure in Singapore